"Yo Mister" is a song by American singer Patti LaBelle. It was written and produced by Prince for her 1989 album, Be Yourself. The singer features on various instruments and background vocals on the song which was released as a single in July 1989. It became a top ten hit on the US Hot R&B/Hip-Hop Songs when it peaked at number six, becoming one of LaBelle's biggest R&B hits. "Yo Mister"s single mix and corresponding video version was mixed by Chris Lord-Alge.

Credits and personnel 
Credits adapted from the liner notes of Be Yourself.
Patti LaBelle – vocals
Arranged, produced and played by Prince
Recorded, mixed and remixed by Timmy Regisford

Charts

References

1989 singles
1989 songs
Patti LaBelle songs
MCA Records singles
New jack swing songs
Song recordings produced by Prince (musician)
Songs written by Prince (musician)